In human anatomy, the groin (the adjective is inguinal, as in inguinal canal) is the junctional area (also known as the inguinal region) between the abdomen and the thigh on either side of the pubic bone. This is also known as the medial compartment of the thigh that consists of the adductor muscles of the hip or the groin muscles. 

A pulled groin muscle usually refers to a painful injury sustained by straining the hip adductor muscles. These hip adductor muscles that make up the groin consist of the adductor brevis, adductor longus, adductor magnus, gracilis, and pectineus. These groin muscles adduct the thigh (bring the femur and knee closer to the midline). 

The groin is innervated by the obturator nerve, with two exceptions:  the pectineus muscle is innervated by the femoral nerve, and the hamstring portion of adductor magnus is innervated by the tibial nerve. 

In the groin, underneath the skin, there are three to five deep inguinal lymph nodes that play a role in the immune system. These can be swollen due to certain diseases, the most common one being a simple infection, and, less likely, from cancer. A chain of superficial inguinal lymph nodes drain to the deep nodes.

The inguinal ligament runs from the pubic tubercle to the anterior superior iliac spine, and its anatomy is very important for hernia operations.

Clinical significance
Like other flexion surfaces of large joints (popliteal fossa, armpit, cubital fossa and essentially the anterior part of the neck), it is an area where blood vessels and nerves pass relatively superficially, and with an increased amount of lymph nodes.
	
In a venography procedure, the groin is the preferred site for incisions to enter a catheter into the vascular system.

See also
 Athletic pubalgia
 Loin (space between the ribs and pelvis)

References

Human anatomy